The Women's 4 × 200 metre freestyle relay competition of the 2014 European Aquatics Championships was held on 21 August. With right entries there was no preliminary heats; only one final race was contested.

Records
Prior to the competition, the existing world, European and championship records were as follows.

Results

Final
The final was held at 19:38.

References

Women's 4 x 200 metre freestyle relay